The Colonel Liam Stakes is a Listed American Thoroughbred horse race run annually in late February or early March on the turf course at Gulfstream Park in Hallandale Beach, Florida over a distance of 1 1/16 miles. A listed event open to three-year-old horses and currently offers a purse of $200,000.

History
The inaugural running in 1987 was run as the Palm Beach Handicap for horses age three and older. Since then it has been run on an allowance weight basis.

Kitten's Joy, who won the race in 2004, went on to be named that year's Champion Turf Horse after winning the Joe Hirsch Turf Classic and Secretariat Stakes and finishing second in the Breeders' Cup Turf. 2010 winner Paddy O'Prado finished third in the Kentucky Derby, first in the Secretariat, and sixth in the Breeders' Cup Classic in his three-year-old season. 1993 winner Kissin Kris went on to finish seventh in the that' year's Kentucky Derby, second in the Belmont Stakes, first in the Haskell Invitational Stakes, and third in the Breeders' Cup Classic in his three-year-old season.

Jockey Chris Antley's February 9, 1991 win aboard Magic Interlude was one of his five wins that day.

The race was run in two divisions in 1989. It was switched to dirt in 1990, 1993 and 1995.

The Palm Springs has been run at several distances:
 7 furlongs – 1990
 1 mile – 1987–1989
  miles – 1991–1994, 2015 to present
  miles – 1995–2014

The event was downgraded to Listed status in 2021.

In 2023 the event was renamed as the Colonel Liam Stakes after Colonel Liam who won the Pegasus World Cup Turf Invitational twice.

Records
Speed record: (at current distance of 1-1/16 miles)
 1:40.38 – Ticonderoga (2017)

Most wins by a jockey:
 3 – Jerry Bailey (2002, 2003, 2004)
 3 – Javier Castellano (2008, 2009, 2016)
 3 – John Velazquez (2012, 2014, 2018)

Most wins by a trainer:
 3 – William I. Mott (1984, 1985, 1998, 2014)
 3 – Dale L. Romans (2004, 2007, 2010)

Most wins by an owner:
 2 – Kenneth and Sarah Ramsey (2003, 2004)
 2 – Peter Vegso (2002, 2006)

Winners

References

1948 establishments in Florida
Horse races in Florida
Gulfstream Park
Flat horse races for three-year-olds
Turf races in the United States
Triple Crown Prep Races
Recurring sporting events established in 1948